Anacamptomyia   is a genus of flies in the family Tachinidae.

Species
Anacamptomyia africana Bischof, 1904
Anacamptomyia aurifrons Zeegers, 2014
Anacamptomyia bisetosa (Roubaud & Villeneuve, 1914)
Anacamptomyia blommersi Zeegers, 2014
Anacamptomyia gymnops Zeegers, 2007
Anacamptomyia nigriventris (Malloch, 1930)
Anacamptomyia obscurella Mesnil, 1950
Anacamptomyia pallida (Roubaud & Villeneuve, 1914)
Anacamptomyia pruinosa (Roubaud & Villeneuve, 1914)
Anacamptomyia rufescens (Villeneuve, 1910)

References

Diptera of Africa
Diptera of Australasia
Exoristinae
Tachinidae genera